The Black Mountains is a mountain range in central Bhutan, and is a sub−range of the Himalayan Range System. Locally the mountain range is known as Dungshing Gang which means the peaks of fir.

Geography

National Park
Jigme Singye Wangchuck National Park protects a large area of the Black Mountains and the Eastern Himalayan broadleaf forests ecoregion within them. It was originally named Black Mountains National Park.

Alpine lakes
The black mountains range is home to some of the beautiful alpine lakes which are the source of some rivers. 
The lakes are:
Gesatsho
Tshonamtsho
Broksatsho
Mendatsho
Peptatsho
Bekhotsho
Tshobobzhao
Sertsho
Yutsho

Socio-cultural significance

Deity Jowo Dungshing

Dungshing Go

See also
Mountains of Bhutan

References

Mountain ranges of Bhutan
Mountain ranges of the Himalayas
Sarpang District
Tsirang District
Trongsa District
Wangdue Phodrang District
Zhemgang District